The Crescent Street station is a station on the BMT Jamaica Line of the New York City Subway. Located at the intersection of Crescent and Fulton Streets in Cypress Hills, Brooklyn, it is served by the J train at all times and the Z during rush hours in the peak direction.

History
This station was opened on May 30, 1893 as part of the Brooklyn Elevated Railroad's four stop extension of the Lexington Avenue Line to Cypress Hills.

Joint service with the Long Island Rail Road's Atlantic Branch existed between Norwood Avenue and Crescent Street stations with a connection built at Chestnut Street in Brooklyn. This allowed BRT trains to access the Rockaways and Manhattan Beach while affording the LIRR a connection into Manhattan to the BRT terminal located at Park Row over the Brooklyn Bridge (this service predated the opening of the East River Tunnels to Penn Station). This service ended in 1917 when the United States Railroad Administration took over the LIRR, and classified different operating standards between rapid transit trains and regular heavy rail railroads such as the LIRR. The ramp was taken down in 1942 for World War II scrap. A tower continued to stand west of the station to control trains using the incline until it was taken down sometime after 1970.

This station was renovated in 2007. As part of the station renovation project, the stairs were rehabilitated, the floors were renewed, major structural repairs were made, new canopies were installed, the area around the station booth was reconfigured, the platform edge strips were replaced, walls were replaced, and a high-quality public address system was installed. The renovation cost $8.43 million.

Station layout

This elevated station has two tracks and one narrow island platform. An arched canopy covers the eastern half (railroad north) of the platform.

An artwork called Wheel of Bloom – Soak Up the Sun by Jung Hyang Kim was installed in this station during a 2007 renovation. It consists of stained glass panels on the platform's sign structures showing subway train wheels lit by sunlight.

A sharp S Curve moves the line from Fulton Street to Jamaica Avenue immediately north of the station. From the late-1950s into the 1960s the New York City Transit Authority had a proposal to realign the BMT Jamaica Line from this station (actually from Grant or Nichols Avenues) northeast to 80th Street and Jamaica Avenue, west of the 85th Street station. This would have also included an express track. The realignment was never carried out.

Exits
The station's small, single station house is on the extreme eastern end of the platform. It has a turnstile bank, token booth, and a single staircase going to an overpass below the tracks that splits into two staircases going down to either side of Fulton Street between Crescent and Pine Streets.

Gallery

References

External links 

 
 Station Reporter — J Train
 The Subway Nut — Crescent Street Pictures
 MTA's Arts For Transit — Crescent Street (BMT Jamaica Line)
 Crescent Street entrance from Google Maps Street View
 Platform from Google Maps Street View

BMT Jamaica Line stations
1893 establishments in New York (state)
Cypress Hills, Brooklyn
New York City Subway stations in Brooklyn
Railway stations in the United States opened in 1893